The joint Argentina–Uruguay bid for the 2023 FIBA Basketball World Cup was the Argentine Basketball Federation and Uruguayan Basketball Federation's unsuccessful joint bid for the right to host the 2023 FIBA Basketball World Cup.

The campaign was led by Argentina, where most of the proposed venues were situated. The bid was one of the two finalist bids, along with the joint Philippines–Japan–Indonesia winning bid.

Background
On January 11, 2017, the joint bid was announced in Buenos Aires, by the Argentine Basketball Federation and the Uruguayan Basketball Federation.
The bid was launched by Argentine politician Esteban Bullrich, footballer Fernando Cáceres, and bid presidents Federico Susbielles and Ricardo Vairo. On May 22, 2017, the bid team unveiled its candidature logo and slogan: "Two Countries, One Passion" (Spanish: "Dos países, una pasión"), in Montevideo.

According to media reports, Buenos Aires would have been the host to four Preliminary Round Groups, two Second Round Groups, and the Final tournament phase, from the Quarterfinals onward. Montevideo would have been the host to two Preliminary Round Groups and two Second Round Groups.

Proposed venues
Five venues, from five host cities were proposed for the bid.

Bid presentation
The bid was presented on October 17, 2017, in Buenos Aires.

Aftermath

On December 9, 2017, FIBA decided to award the hosting rights of the 2023 FIBA Basketball World Cup to the Philippines, Japan, and Indonesia, over Argentina and Uruguay, following the final bid presentation, that was held on the same day, in Mies, Switzerland. However, citing the quality of the two joint-bids, FIBA decided to give Argentina and Uruguay the chance to make an unopposed bid for the 2027 FIBA Basketball World Cup. They were told to make adjustments to their original bid, as recommended by FIBA, and were scheduled to represent their new bid to the basketball world body in June 2018; after which FIBA was to decide if it would award the hosting rights for the 2027 edition of the tournament to the two South American countries.

However, Argentina and Uruguay ultimately decided to withdraw their bid for the 2027 FIBA World Cup, on 24 May 2018.

See also
2017 FIBA AmeriCup

References

2017–18 in Argentine basketball
2017 in Uruguayan sport
Argentina-Uruguay bid
Fiba World Championship 2023 bid
Fiba World Championship 2023 bid
Argentina–Uruguay bid